Helen Aileen Hooper Cowan (born June 11, 1926) is a Canadian painter and sculptor.

Cowan was born in Windsor, Ontario, and received a bachelor's degree from the University of Toronto. She undertook graduate work both there and at Queen's University. She has exhibited widely both in Canada and abroad, both alone and in groups, and her work is represented in collections such as those of the Robert McLaughlin Gallery and the University of Western Ontario. Among her awards was the Augusta Kopmanis Memorial award, which she received in 1980. Cowan has been a member of the Sculptors' Society of Canada since 1986, and served for a time as the organization's president (1983-1985).

References

1926 births
Living people
Canadian women painters
Canadian women sculptors
Artists from Windsor, Ontario
University of Toronto alumni
Queen's University at Kingston alumni
20th-century Canadian painters
20th-century Canadian sculptors
20th-century Canadian women artists
21st-century Canadian painters
21st-century Canadian sculptors
21st-century Canadian women artists